AB Pictoris (abbreviated AB Pic, also catalogued as HD 44627) is a K-type star, approximately 163 light-years away in the constellation of Pictor.  It has been identified as a member of the young (30 million years old) Tucana–Horologium association.  The star has also been classified as a BY Draconis variable. In 2005 it was announced that an astronomical object (AB Pictoris b, abbreviated AB Pic b) had been imaged in 2003 and 2004 close to and apparently in orbit around the star. Its mass suggests that it is at the borderline between being a brown dwarf or a planet.

Possible planetary system 
In 2003 and 2004, an object (now catalogued as AB Pictoris b) was observed close to the star by a team of astronomers at the European Southern Observatory.  Since it had common proper motion with AB Pictoris, it was concluded that it was physically close to the star.  Its spectral type was estimated as between L0V and L3V.  Using evolutionary models, its mass was estimated as from 13 to 14 Jupiter masses.  However, because modelling such young objects is difficult, this estimate is very uncertain; some models give masses as low as 11 Jupiter masses or as high as 70 Jupiter masses.  Temperature estimates range from 1600 K to 2400 K.  As it is not known if the mass of the object exceeds the deuterium burning limit of 13 Jupiter masses, it is not clear whether the object should be classified as an extrasolar planet or a brown dwarf. The planetary orbit is significantly misaligned with its spin axis orientation (obliquity), possibly due to gravitational interactions with the additional inner planet.

See also
 51 Pegasi
 Beta Pictoris
 GQ Lupi

References

External links
 
 Homogeneous comparison of directly detected planet candidates: GQ Lup, 2M1207, AB Pic, Ralph Neuhaeuser, ESO Workshop Proceedings on Multiple Stars, .
 

K-type main-sequence stars
Pictor (constellation)
030034
044627
Pictoris, AB
CD-58 01409
BY Draconis variables
Planetary systems with one confirmed planet